Money Train is a 1995 American action comedy film starring Wesley Snipes, Woody Harrelson, and Jennifer Lopez, with Robert Blake and Chris Cooper in supporting roles.

Plot
Foster brothers John and Charlie Robinson are  transit cops patrolling the New York City Subway. On Christmas, they chase two muggers into a subway tunnel. Nearby trains are halted, but transit captain Donald Patterson allows the money train – hauling subway revenue – to continue. One of the teenage muggers is gunned down and killed by transit cops guarding the money train, triggering a brawl between them and the brothers. Patterson blames John and Charlie for delaying the money train.

Charlie asks John for money to buy a Christmas present, but instead uses it to pay off gambling debts to mobster Mr. Brown, only to get even more into debt when Brown intends to have his men throw Charlie off a building, until  John intervenes. Revealing Charlie is $15,000 in debt, John at first decides to let them drop him,  yet after a brief conversation Mr. Brown accepts John’s promise to deliver the money in a few days.

John and Charlie both take a liking to Grace Santiago, a newly assigned decoy transit officer. When a serial killer known as the Torch robs a token booth and sets it on fire at risk of killing the booth attendant, John and Charlie rescue the attendant and put out the fire, but Torch escapes and knocks out Grace.

John rejects Charlie’s plan to rob the money train to pay off the debt. When they and Grace are assigned to patrol the money train, Charlie discovers a grate in the train’s floor and a maintenance ladder leading to Central Park. A brawl breaks out between John and another officer, quickly involving the entire squad. Again blaming the brothers and accusing them of taking some of the money, Patterson continues to berate them even after realizing a collection agent miscounted. Charlie tells John the best time to rob the money train would be New Year's Eve, due to looser security and the year’s highest proceeds: up to $4,000,000 that night.

John gives Charlie $15,000 to pay back Mr. Brown, but while on the train, Charlie loses it to an old lady and is beaten by Brown’s men as punishment. John is visited by Grace, having both realized their mutual attraction to each other and the two have sex. Returning home, stopping by John’s apartment, he is saddened to spot Grace and John sleeping together and walks away, with John feeling remorse for hurting Charlie (as well as disappointment after Charlie tells him he lost the money).

In a sting operation to apprehend Torch, Grace is disguised as a token booth attendant. Realizing the trap, Torch distracts police by pushing a man in front of a moving train, killing him. Torch sprays gasoline on Grace, but before he can light it, Charlie alerts the other officers, who open fire. John pursues the killer into another station, where they fight. Torch is burned by his gasoline and killed by an approaching train. Patterson fires Charlie for ruining the ambush; trying to defend Charlie, John is fired as well, leading to the brothers having a major falling out.

On New Year's Eve, John storms into Mr. Brown’s strip club, after hearing about Charlie and defeats the mobsters using his martial arts skills, threatening Brown if anything happens to Charlie, knocking him out with a 360-degree kick into a glass enclosure.

Grace persuades John to intervene in Charlie’s robbery. Charlie enters the money train from beneath, throws out the driver and drives it to the ladder, but is unable to escape with the money due to the presence of a group of NYPD Mounted cops. Reaching the train, John persuades Charlie to drive further to avoid arrest, and they disable the brakes to prevent Patterson activating them remotely. Patterson deploys a steel barricade, but John and Charlie accidentally increase the train's maximum speed and smash through the barricade. Transit control officer Kowalski declares the money train a runaway and starts clearing tracks, but Patterson diverts the train onto a track occupied by a passenger train, a 1220, to prevent its riders' escape, and does not tell the driver about the money train. When Charlie tries to steal the money, John attempts to stop him from doing so, leading to a brawl between the brothers. Eventually, the two stop fighting when Charlie saves John from falling off the train. The money train slams into the rear of the passenger train and slows down, but speeds up again, continuing to ram it with the increasing risk of derailing it and killing everyone on board, including the driver.

With no brakes and the throttle jammed, the brothers decide to throw the train into reverse to save the passenger train. Charlie positions an iron bar to trip the reverse lever, and the brothers climb on top of the train. The money train rams into 1220 again, activating the reverse lever, putting it into reverse position and the brothers jump across to the 1220 train as the money train derails, to the horror of Patterson, who is waiting at the next station with the officers.

When arriving, the brothers try to escape but are spotted by Patterson, who interrogates them. Fed up with his abuse, they both punch him in the face after he spits at John. As Patterson shouts out for their arrest, he is arrested himself by Grace for endangering the passengers’ lives, much to the brothers amazement. The brothers then exit onto Times Square just as the New Year countdown begins and ends, ringing in 1996. During the celebration, John realizes Charlie has a bag with over $500,000, much to his dismay. The film closes with the brothers walking off into the distance arguing over the money while the credits roll.

Cast

 Wesley Snipes as Officer John Robinson
 Woody Harrelson as Officer Charlie Robinson
 Jennifer Lopez as Officer Grace Santiago
 Robert Blake as Captain Donald Patterson
 Chris Cooper as Terry "The Torch" Edwards
 Joe Grifasi as Riley
 Scott Sowers as Mr. Brown
 Skipp Sudduth as Kowalski
 Enrico Colantoni as Dooley

Production

Snipes and Harrelson had appeared together in the 1992 hit White Men Can't Jump. They were both paid $5.5 million to star in Money Train.

The subway car used as the money train in the film is a modified R21 subway car. The rolling stock was modified by the Metropolitan Transportation Authority and film crew into an imposing subway train covered in silver armor plating and equipped with flashing orange lights and sliding barred doors, like those on a jail cell. After production, the car was donated to the New York Transit Museum, and is currently stored at the Coney Island Complex as of February 2010. Other cars were used as props in the movie.

Four additional R30s were used for filming on New York City Subway property, including for the crash between the money train and the 1220 Coney Island. These four cars were 8463, 8510, 8558, and 8569.

The actual money train resembled a normal maintenance train painted yellow with black diagonal stripes. The New York City subway system retired its money trains in 2006, as the introduction of the MetroCard and computerized vending machines that allowed fare payment by credit card have dramatically reduced the number of coins stored in subway stations. Two money train cars were later sent to the New York Transit Museum.

Music
The original music score by Mark Mancina was released in March 2011 by La-La Land Records as a limited edition of 3000 copies. The album features approximately 41 minutes of music across 17 tracks. Additional music was composed by John Van Tongeren.

Reception

Box office
The film took in $35.4 million at the North American box office, including $10.6 million on its opening weekend. In 2005, USA Today characterized it as a "bomb".

Critical response
Rotten Tomatoes, a review aggregator, reports that 22% of 32 surveyed critics gave the film a positive review; the average rating was 4.3/10. The site's consensus states: "Loud, incoherent, and aimless, Money Train reunites Snipes and Harrelson -- and proves that starring duos are far from immune to the law of diminishing returns." Brian Lowry of Variety wrote that it "bounces along with a lame script and inconsistent pace". Stephen Holden of The New York Times wrote, "More viscerally charged than Speed and hipper than Die Hard With a Vengeance, the movie is a careening, screeching joyride that showers sparks like fireworks." Mick LaSalle of the San Francisco Examiner called it "a cut above the usual" buddy cop film due to the stars' chemistry and its well-crafted action scenes. Kenneth Turan of the Los Angeles Times described it as "a by-the-numbers action-buddy picture" that is "an acceptable if undemanding venture". Ken Tucker of Entertainment Weekly rated it D+ and called it "a big, noisy headache of a movie." Hal Hinson of The Washington Post called it a feeble and clichéd buddy film.

Filmink said the film "exemplifies bloated dumb ‘90s action. J Lo is good though."

In addition to its poor reviews, the film was vilified for its portrayal of 'The Torch' robbing a ticket booth by running a rubber tube around the bulletproof partition and dousing the attendant with an unknown flammable liquid, then threatening to set them on fire. This crime was repeated in real life after the film's release, although police did not think the similar crime was related to the film. Nevertheless, many people, including Bob Dole, called for a boycott of the film.

See also
 Kingston–Throop Avenues (IND Fulton Street Line)

References

External links

 
 

1995 films
1995 action comedy films
1990s buddy comedy films
1990s buddy cop films
1990s crime comedy films
1990s heist films
American action comedy films
American buddy comedy films
American buddy cop films
American crime comedy films
American heist films
American police detective films
African-American comedy films
Columbia Pictures films
Films set around New Year
Films set on the New York City Subway
Films directed by Joseph Ruben
Films produced by Jon Peters
Films scored by Mark Mancina
Films with screenplays by David Loughery
Kung fu films
1990s English-language films
1990s American films
Films about train robbery